Rafter is both a given name and a surname that may refer to:

Surname 
Athol Rafter (1913–1996), New Zealand nuclear chemist
Charles Rafter (1860–1935), British police officer
Clifford Marle (real name Patrick Cassamer Rafter, born 1885), successful actor and producer of the early 20th century, appearing in several silent films.
Henry Rafter (born 1830), British master artist and former Headmaster of School of Arts of Coventry
Jack Rafter (1875–1943), Major League Baseball catcher
John Rafter Lee, British actor, voice actor, professional narrator
Kevin Rafter, Irish journalist and academic
Kitty Clive (née Rafter) (1711–1785), British actress of considerable repute on the stages of London
Michael Rafter, American arranger, musical director, musical supervisor and conductor
Mike Rafter, rugby union coach and former Bristol and England flanker
Nicole Hahn Rafter, Feminist criminology professor at Northeastern University
Orlaith Rafter, Irish actor, novelist and playwright
Patrick Rafter, Former World Number One tennis player
Captain Seamus Rafter (1873-1918), IRA commandant for Wexford, Ireland during the 1916 Rising
Colonel William Rafter (died 1819), executed in Panama following his capture at the Spanish retaking of Porto Bello, South America.

Given name 
Rafter Bats, artist who has taken part in a concert Gathering of the Vibes in 2001
Rafter Roberts, musician and producer of rock band Rafter of San Diego, U.S.

Fictional characters 
Ben Rafter, Dave Rafter, Melissa Rafter, Nathan Rafter, Rachel Rafter, Sammy Rafter, Julie Rafter, Ruby Rafter, are roles in the television series Packed to the Rafters

See also 
Raft (disambiguation)
Rafter (disambiguation)
Rafting (disambiguation)